Philippe Ernest Augustin Renouard (15 September 1862 in Paris – 2 October 1934 in Paris) was a French bookseller and bibliographer, specialist of the 16th century.

Biography 
A grandson of Charles Renouard and son of Alfred Renouard, founder with D'Eichthal of the Compagnie des Salins du Midi, Philippe Renouard studied at the Lycée Condorcet. He was later sent to the University of Montpellier in order to succeed his father in the Salins du Midi. After the death of his father in 1883, and that of D'Eichthal, he turned to a career in the Conseil d'État and took the entrance exam but decided to devote himself to books.

Partnering in 1892 with Georges Chamerot, the printer of Revue des deux Mondes, he took over the business, which he renamed Imprimerie Renouard, located at 19 , then played an important role in the typographers' trade unions.

A laureate of the Institut de France (prix Brunet), he was a member of the admissions committee of the Milan International (1906).

Main publications 
 Imprimeurs et libraires parisiens du XVIe
 Documents sur les imprimeurs, libraires… ayant exercé à Paris de 1450 à 1600, Paris, H. Champion, 1901
 Répertoire des imprimeurs parisiens, libraires et fondeurs de caractères en exercice à Paris au XVIIe. Avant-propos de Dominique Renouard, préf. Henri-Jean Martin, Paris, Minard, 1965

Sources 
 Pierre Marot, Philippe Renouard, 1862–1934

External links 
 Philippe Renouard on data.bnf.fr

French librarians
French bibliographers
French publishers (people)
Chevaliers of the Légion d'honneur
Lycée Condorcet alumni
1862 births
1934 deaths
Writers from Paris